Professor Wendy Bacon (born 1946) is an Australian academic, investigative journalist, and political activist who was head of the Journalism Program at the University of Technology, Sydney. She was awarded Australian journalism's highest prize, a Walkley Award in 1984 for her articles about police corruption in New South Wales.

On her own website Bacon describes her approach to journalism and political activism:

Early life and education
Bacon is the daughter of a doctor and the sister of the former Premier of Tasmania, Jim Bacon. During her early years the family lived in the Melbourne suburb of Reservoir. Educated at the Presbyterian Ladies' College, Melbourne, she attended the University of Melbourne in the mid-1960s where she was active in the anti-Vietnam War campaigning.

In the late 1960s, Bacon attended the University of New South Wales, where she was a member of the Kensington Libertarians, edited the student newspaper Tharunka and later the underground anti-censorship paper Thor. She was part of the group that distributed a publication called The Little Red Schoolbook which had explicit information about sex.

When she was 23, Bacon was convicted for exhibiting an obscene publication and jailed at Mulawah Women's Prison for eight days. Her brief experience in prison led her to later co-found the support group, Women Behind Bars, in Sydney and also exposed her to incidents of police corruption.

Career
Bacon wrote a series of articles in The National Times newspaper on the attempted bribe and murder of Detective Michael Drury in the 1980s and this story formed the basis of the award-winning ABC television mini-series, Blue Murder.

Bacon has worked in both print and television, working for the Nine Network on the Sunday program and 60 Minutes, The National Times and The Sun-Herald, and Dateline on the Special Broadcasting Service (SBS).

Bacon enrolled in graduate law school in 1977. Upon graduation in 1979 she applied to join the New South Wales Bar Association, but was rejected on character grounds as an unsuitable person. In his judgment, Justice Reynolds stated that the decision was "a question of whether a person who aspires to serve the law can be said to be fit to do so when it is demonstrated that in the zealous pursuit of political goals she will break the law if she regards it as impeding the success of her cause".  Justice Reynolds and two other justices of the NSW Court of Appeal found unanimously that Bacon had lied in her evidence to the court about her role in conspiring with others to illegally get a prisoner out of gaol by putting up a dummy bail surety. The court described the plan by Bacon and her cohorts as a put-up job.  It was principally on the basis of this finding that the Court unanimously determined that Bacon was not a fit and proper person to be a barrister.  The court case was subsequently reported in the New South Wales Law Reports: In Re B [1981] 2 NSWLR 372 and for several years was taught to law students and Bar Course students in ethics courses.

Subsequent to this she became a journalist and, during the mid-1980s, was involved in reporting the case of High Court judge Lionel Murphy. Murphy, who was alleged by some to have connections to organised crime,  was charged with perverting the course of justice, and convicted, but was acquitted after two appeals. Bacon received a Walkley award in 1984 for her exposure of official corruption in New South Wales.

From 1991 to August 2012 Bacon was an academic at the University of Technology, Sydney, where she taught journalism at the Australian Centre for Independent Journalism (ACIJ). She continues to write as a freelance investigative journalist, with a series of articles about one police officer's corrupt framing of his ex-wife eventually leading to the overturn of a miscarriage of justice. Bacon also runs courses in freedom of information law for Fairfax Media.

Alongside her distinguished career as a journalist and academic, she has continued an interest in anarchism, feminism and political activism. In 2016 Bacon was arrested at a protest to stop the construction of the WestConnex motorway.

References

External links
 
 Australian Centre for Independent Journalism

Australian freelance journalists
University of Sydney alumni
Academic staff of the University of Technology Sydney
Living people
1946 births
University of Melbourne alumni
University of Melbourne women
Walkley Award winners
Australian anarchists
Australian activists
Australian feminists
20th-century Australian women